François Gacon (1667–1725) was a French poet and translator.

External links
 

1667 births
1725 deaths
18th-century French writers
18th-century French male writers
French translators
Alumni of Oratorian schools
French male poets